Kushiel's Avatar is a fantasy novel by American writer Jacqueline Carey, the third book in her  Kushiel's Legacy series. It is often referred to as the last of the Phèdre Trilogy.

Synopsis
In the ten years of peace following the events of Kushiel's Chosen, Phèdre nó Delaunay has prospered. As the foremost courtesan of Terre D'Ange and the confidante of the Queen, she has a place at the peak of D'Angeline society. But the fate of her oldest friend Hyacinthe, living out the terms of an angel's curse, is never far from her heart. The search for the key to his freedom intertwines in unexpected ways with the quest for the missing son of her onetime lover and sometime enemy, Melisande Shahrizai. Phèdre and her consort Joscelin Verreuil travel through many lands, finding the boy in the darkest place on earth and fighting through hell to thwart his captors.

External links
 

2003 American novels
American fantasy novels
Tor Books books